Victor Joseph Henderson  (born 10 January 1941) is a former British diplomat.

He was educated at King's College London (BA Spanish, 1961) and served as British Ambassador to Yemen from 1997 to 2001.

Honours
  Companion of the Order of St Michael and St George (CMG) - 2000

References

1941 births
Living people
Alumni of King's College London
Ambassadors of the United Kingdom to Yemen
Companions of the Order of St Michael and St George